Senator Knutson may refer to:

David Knutson (born 1959), Minnesota State Senate
Milo Knutson (1917–1981), Wisconsin State Senate

See also
Senator Knudson (disambiguation)